AD 82 (LXXXII) was a common year starting on Tuesday (link will display the full calendar) of the Julian calendar. At the time, it was known as the Year of the Consulship of Augustus and Sabinus (or, less frequently, year 835 Ab urbe condita). The denomination AD 82 for this year has been used since the early medieval period, when the Anno Domini calendar era became the prevalent method in Europe for naming years.

Events

By place

Roman Empire 
 Emperor Domitian becomes Roman Consul.
 Gnaeus Julius Agricola raises a fleet, and encircles the Celtic tribes beyond the Forth; the Caledonians rise in great numbers against the Romans. They attack the camp of Legio IX Hispana at night, but Agricola sends his cavalry in, and puts them to flight. 
 Calgacus unites the Picts (30,000 men) in Scotland, and is made chieftain of the Caledonian Confederacy.  
 Dio Chrysostom is banished from Rome, Italy, and Bithynia, after advising one of the Emperor's conspiring relatives.
 Domitian levies Legio I Minervia.

Births 
 Wang Fu, Chinese historian and philosopher (d. 167)

Deaths 
 Anianus, Patriarch of Alexandria

References 

0082

als:80er#Johr 82